Oscar Klein (5 January 1930 in Graz, Austria – 12 December 2006 in Baden-Württemberg) was an Austrian born jazz trumpeter who also played clarinet, harmonica, and swing guitar. His family fled the Nazis when he was young. He became known for "older jazz" like swing and Dixieland. In the early sixties he joined  the famous Dutch Swing College Band in the Netherlands as first trumpeter and he is to be found on several of their recordings. He played with Lionel Hampton, Joe Zawinul, Jerry Ricks and others. In 1996 he was honored by then President Thomas Klestil.

References

Dixieland trumpeters
Swing guitarists
Austrian jazz trumpeters
Male trumpeters
1930 births
2006 deaths
20th-century American guitarists
20th-century trumpeters
American jazz trumpeters
American male trumpeters
American male guitarists
20th-century American male musicians
American male jazz musicians
Dutch Swing College Band members
Dixieland guitarists